Estanislau de Figueiredo Pamplona, best known as Pamplona (born in Belém, Pará State, 24 March 1904 – 29 October 1973) was a Brazilian footballer in offensive midfield role.

Pamplona played club football (1922–1935) for Remo, Fluminense and Botafogo. He won three Rio de Janeiro State Championship (in 1930, 1933, and 1934). For the Brazilian team, he was on roster for the 1930 FIFA World Cup but never played a game. He died at 69 years old.

Honours

Club
 Campeonato Carioca (3): 
Botafogo: 1930, 1933, 1934

References

1904 births
1930 FIFA World Cup players
1973 deaths
Sportspeople from Belém
Brazilian footballers
Brazil international footballers
Fluminense FC players
Botafogo de Futebol e Regatas players
Association football midfielders